Babıali Kültür Yayıncılığı (Babiali Cultural Publications in English, abbreviated as BKY) is a publishing company based in Istanbul, Turkey. The company publishes many different kinds of books.

History
Babıali Kültür Yayıncılığı was founded in Istanbul on November 13, 1999 and started to publish books in 2000. It has extended its sphere of activities and brought important books into the Turkish market. Today, it is one of the leading publishing companies in Turkey with popular authors and important books. Until 15 April 2013, Rahîm Er who is the founder of the company was the chairman of the board. Since 15 April 2013, İsmet Demir holds that post.

Name of the company
Babıali Kültür Yayıncılığı means Babıali Cultural Publications. The word Babıali (Ottoman Turkish Bab-ı Âli) which means High Porte used to refer to the Divan (court) of the Ottoman Empire where government policies were established. The particular term was used in the context of diplomacy by the western states, as their diplomats were received at "porte" (meaning gate).
This word also refers to the media and publication sector in Turkey since the headquarters of media companies were based in Babıali region of Cağaloğlu until the late 1990s. Today headquarters of Turkish national media companies are based at modern towers and office buildings in İkitelli and Yenibosna, Istanbul. However, Cağaloğlu neighborhood of Eminönü (in Fatih district) which represents Babıali concept is still the center of book publishing sector of Turkey.

Books
Today as well as valuable Turkish authors, Babıali Kültür Yayıncılığı has many famous international books of famous international authors, including the following titles:
South Beach Diet (Miami Diyeti), Arthur Agatston
Un Mensonge Français (Bir Fransız Yalanı), Georges-Marc Benamou
Tell No One (Kimseye Söyleme), Harlan Coben
Pour Your Heart into It (Gönlünü İşe Vermek), Howard Schultz
Hollywood, Le Pengagon et Washington (Hollywood, Pentagon ve Washington), Jean-Michel Valantin
Stupid White Men (Aptal Beyaz Adamlar), Michael Moore
Dude, Where's My Country?, (Ahbap, Memleketim Nerede?), Michael Moore

Authors
Today Babıali Kültür Yayıncılığı has many famous authors, including but not limited to the following names:
Adeline Yen Mah
Alphonse de Lamartine
Arthur Agatston
Bartalomé de Las Casas
Gabriel Domergue
Georges-Marc Benamou
Harlan Coben
Howard Schultz
Iris Johansen
İsmet Miroğlu
Jean-Michel Valantin
John Adair
Maria Orsini Natale
Michael Moore
Mikhail Gorbachev
Mahir Kaynak
Yusuf Halaçoğlu
Rahîm Er
Tzvetan Todorov
Yılmaz Öztuna

Haber Kuşağı (haberkusagi.com)
Besides publishing books, Babıali Kültür Yayıncılığı was also publishing Haber Kuşağı (haberkusagi.com) a democrat online newspaper in Turkish, founded on 2 February 2005, suspended itself on 15 April 2013. Haber Kuşağı was covering politics, culture, science, business, and sports, and was naturally updated throughout each day.

Haber Kuşağı used to have several permanent columnists, including academics, former politicians, and some authors of Babıali Kültür Yayıncılığı.

The word "haber" means "news" and "kuşak" means "belt", "generation", "brace", and "zone" in Turkish. "Haber Kuşağı" means "News Zone" and/or "News Flow". It is a trademark of Babıali Kültür Yayıncılığı registered under the Turkish Patent Institute.

References

External links
 BKY - Babıali Kültür Yayıncılığı web site
 Haber Kuşağı web site

Book publishing companies of Turkey
Publishing companies established in 1999
1999 establishments in Turkey